The Dulwich Manor, also known as Dulwich Farm, Dulwich House, and Amherst Academy, is a historic home located near Amherst, Amherst County, Virginia. It was built in 1909, and is a 2½-story, five bay, Classical Revival style brick dwelling. The façade is dominated by a large, two-story portico capped by a pediment formed by a cross gable roof with a small tripartite Palladian window in the tympanum. The house is covered by a steeply-pitched hipped roof of slate shingles.  Also on the property is a contributing shed and gateposts.

It was listed on the National Register of Historic Places in 2013.

References

Houses on the National Register of Historic Places in Virginia
Houses completed in 1909
Neoclassical architecture in Virginia
Houses in Amherst County, Virginia
National Register of Historic Places in Amherst County, Virginia
U.S. Route 60